First Presbyterian Day School (FPD) is a private, college-preparatory Christian day school in Macon, Georgia, United States. FPD was founded in 1970 by Macon's First Presbyterian Church and has been described at the time of its founding as a segregation academy.

History
First Presbyterian Day School was founded in 1970. The First Presbyterian church founded the school the same year that a judge ordered Bibb County public schools to desegregate. The school has been tax-exempt since 1971 and maintains a policy of non-discrimination.

Demographics
The demographic breakdown of the 919 K-12 students enrolled in 2015–2016 was:
Asian - 1.7%
Black - 6.1%
Hispanic - 1.0%
White - 90.4%
Multiracial - 0.8%
NCES does not gather demographic data for the 42 Pre-K students.

Athletics
Since the fall of 2010, FPD has competed in the Georgia High School Association. 2010 was its last year in the Georgia Independent School Association.

The Vikings and Lady Vikings compete in baseball, basketball, cheering, cross-country, dance, football, golf, lacrosse, marksmanship, soccer, softball, swimming, tennis, track and field, volleyball, wrestling, and gymnastics.

Since joining the GHSA in 2010, FPD has won numerous region and area championships as well as two state championships in girls' soccer  and state championships in softball and clay target shooting.

Academics

The elementary school was named a national Blue Ribbon School by the U.S. Department of Education in 2003, and the middle school was named a national Blue Ribbon School in 2012. The elementary school was again awarded the Blue Ribbon in 2015.

FPD is accredited by the Southern Association of Colleges and Schools.

Notable alumni

 Robert McDuffie, Grammy-nominated violinist 
 John Rocker, former major league baseball relief pitcher

References

External links
 

Presbyterian schools in the United States
Educational institutions established in 1970
Schools in Macon, Georgia
Christian schools in Georgia (U.S. state)